Lord mayor is a title of a mayor of what is usually a major city in a Commonwealth realm, with special recognition bestowed by the sovereign. However, the title or an equivalent is present in other countries, including forms such as "high mayor". Aldermen usually elect the lord mayor from their ranks.

Commonwealth of Nations

Australia 
In Australia, lord mayor is a special status granted by the monarch to mayors of major cities, primarily the capitals of Australian states and territories. Australian cities with lord mayors are Adelaide, Brisbane, Darwin, Hobart, Melbourne, Newcastle, Parramatta, Perth, Sydney, and Wollongong.

Canada 
In Canada, the only town with a lord mayor in the traditional sense is Niagara-on-the-Lake, as recognition of its role as the first capital of Upper Canada. Unusually, the council of Brantford, Ontario took it upon itself to appoint an honorary Lord Mayor Walter Gretzky in addition to the elected mayor. This is the only example of a council granting the cachet itself, rather than it being granted by a higher authority, such as the Crown or national government.

United Kingdom 

In England, Wales, and Northern Ireland, it is a purely ceremonial post conferred by letters patent. Most famously it refers to the Lord Mayor of London, who only has jurisdiction over the City of London, as opposed to the modern title of Mayor of London governing Greater London.

Uganda 
In Uganda, the only jurisdiction with a lord mayor is Kampala, in recognition of its status as the capital city of the country.

Ireland
In Ireland, the posts of Lord Mayor of Dublin (granted under the Kingdom of Ireland) and Lord Mayor of Cork (granted when this city was part of the United Kingdom) still exist, and are symbolic titles as in the UK.

Province of Maryland
Annapolis, the only city in the Thirteen Colonies to receive a royal charter, used the title 'lord mayor' prior to the American Revolution.

Equivalents in other languages
 In Denmark, as the translation of Danish Overborgmester, it is the title of the highest mayor of Denmark's capital city, Copenhagen.
 In Germany, it is sometimes (and perhaps anachronistically or incongruously) used to translate German Oberbürgermeister, the title of the mayors of large, often county-free cities. Especially in large cities that consist of subunits governed  by District mayors (Bezirksbürgermeister), the title Oberbürgermeister is usually used to distinguish the head executive of the entire city from those of the subunits. As in Austria, Germany's mayors serve as the actual executive leaders of their cities and are elected officials. However, the post of mayor in the three German city-states is equivalent to that of a Ministerpräsident (head of government of one of Germany's constitutive states) and the respective post is referred to as Regierender Bürgermeister (governing mayor) in Berlin, Erster Bürgermeister (first mayor) in Hamburg and Bürgermeister und Präsident des Senates (Mayor and President of the senate) in Bremen.
 In Finland, the head city manager of the capital, Helsinki, is customarily given by the country's President the title ylipormestari [loosely translated: "high mayor"] (which then generally is much more used of the official than kaupunginjohtaja, the title of the office itself), a tradition that resembles closely the lord mayoralties in other countries.
 In Romania and Moldova, the mayors of the capitals (Bucharest and Chişinău, respectively) are named Primar General which means general mayor. The name is ceremonial and it has no higher powers than mayors of other cities.
 In Hungary, the mayor of the capital Budapest is called főpolgármester which means chief mayor or grand mayor. Only the capital has a főpolgármester. Between 1873 and 1945, the Lord Mayor of Budapest was representative of the Hungarian government at the capital's municipal authority.
 In ancient China, jīng zhào yĭn (京兆尹) was the title given to the mayor of capital city, jīng zhào (京兆). Today, on the other hand, city mayor and party-appointed secretary (actual leader) of the four direct-controlled municipalities, Beijing, Tianjin, Shanghai, and Chongqing, though without special titles, share the rank of provincial governor and party-appointed secretary.
 In Estonia, the mayor of the capital (Tallinn), was named Lord Mayor (Ülemlinnapea) from 1938 to 1940.
 In Czech Republic, the mayor of the capital Prague and so-called statutory cities (listed in law, currently 25 cities) is called Primátor.
 In Sweden, the titles of mayor and lord mayor have no direct equivalent since the 1970s. The executive leader of Swedish municipalities is one of sometimes several Kommunalråd in the function of the chair of the municipal board. In the capital Stockholm the chief executive is traditionally called Finansborgarråd (City Councillor of Finance)—"council" in this context referring to the executive rather than the legislative branch of local government.
 The Welsh translation of lord mayor is Arglwydd Faer.
 The Irish translation of lord mayor is Ard-Mhéara, which means "chief mayor".
 The Malay translation of lord mayor is Datuk bandar, which means "city chief".
 In the Ethiopian Empire, the Mayor of Addis Ababa was known as Lord Mayor (Kantiba).

Style of address
The style of address for the office of the lord mayors of Belfast, Cardiff, Bristol, the City of London, and York is The Right Honourable. All other lord mayors are The Right Worshipful. This refers only to the post, rather than the person. The title Sir can be used for salutations when a lord mayor is being addressed.

See also 
Lord provost, the similar post in Scotland

References 

Titles
Local government in the United Kingdom